CMA CGM Christophe Colomb is an  built for CMA CGM. It is named after Italian explorer Christopher Columbus. When delivered in November 2009, it was the largest container ship which carried passengers.

References

Container ships
Christophe Colomb
Christophe Colomb
Ships built by Daewoo Shipbuilding & Marine Engineering
2009 ships